Alexandrovskoye Urban Settlement is a municipal formation (an urban settlement) within Alexandrovsky Municipal District of Perm Krai, Russia, which a part of the territory of the town of krai significance of Alexandrovsk is incorporated as. It is one of the three urban settlements in the municipal district.

References

Notes

Sources

Urban settlements of Russia
Geography of Perm Krai